Divya Menon, is an actress best known for playing the character of Satyawati in Yash Raj Films and Dibakar Banerjee’s Detective Byomkesh Bakshy! Divya also starred in Shashi Sudigala's recent release Mona Darling where she was applauded for her performance.

Menon is a design graduate from NIFT Kolkata and has worked with fashion designer Sabyasachi. She is also a singer and plays guitar.

Filmography 
 Detective Byomkesh Bakshy! (2015) as Satyavati
 Mona Darling (2017) as Sarah

References

Detective Byomkesh Bakshy! actress Divya Menon opens up about getting stalked on Facebook
Sabyasachi’s assistant to play Sushant Singh Rajput’s wife in Detective Byomkesh Bakshi?
Casted[sic Sushant Singh Rajput in 'Detective Byomkesh Bakshy' because of his vulnerability: Dibakar Banerjee]

Living people
Indian film actresses
Year of birth missing (living people)